Daring Tact (foaled 15 April 2017) is a champion Japanese Thoroughbred racehorse who won the Japanese Fillies Triple Crown in 2020. After winning her only race as a two-year-old, she won the Elfin Stakes on her three-year-old debut and went on to record Grade 1 victories in the Oka Sho, Yushun Himba and Shuka Sho to complete the Japanese Fillies' Triple Crown. She also came third in the 2020 Japan Cup to other Triple Crown winners Almond Eye and the then undefeated Contrail.

Background
Daring Tact is a brown filly with a small white star bred in Japan by the Hasegawa Bokujo. As a yearling in 2018 she was put up for auction at the Japan Racing Horse Association Select Sale of Yearlings and was bought for ¥12,960,000 by the Normandy Farm. She was sent into training with Haruki Sugiyama.

She was from the first crop of foals sired by Epiphaneia who won the Kikuka Sho and the Japan Cup and was rated the second-best horse in the world in 2014. Daring Tact's dam Daring Bird showed no racing ability but was a daughter of Daring Heart who won the Queen Stakes and Fuchu Himba Stakes as well as being placed in the Oka Sho, NHK Mile Cup and Victoria Mile. Daring Heart was a daughter of the American-bred broodmare Daring Danzig, who was exported to Japan after being sold for $435,000 at Keeneland in November 1998.

Racing career

2019: two-year-old season
Daring Tact made her racecourse debut in a contest for previously unraced juveniles over 1600 metres on firm ground at Kyoto Racecourse on 16 November 2019 and won from the colt No Security.

2020: three-year-old season

On 8 February 2020 Daring Tact began her second campaign in the Listed Elfin Stakes over 1600 metres at Kyoto. She came from tenth place on final turn before showing "top-class acceleration" to take the lead 100 metres from the finish and drew away to win by four lengths. Her trainer Haruki Sugiyama later commented "She was agitated behind the gate and she didn’t break very well. She did settle during the trip however, and displayed a good turn of foot over the last furlong."

On 12 April at Hanshin Racecourse Daring Tact was stepped up in class to contest the 80th running of the Oka Sho over 1600 metres in which she was ridden by Kohei Matsuyama and went off the 3.2/1 second favourite behind Resistencia. The other sixteen runners included Sanctuaire (Shinzan Kinen), Ria Amelia (Artemis Stakes), Maltese Diosa (Tulip Sho), Miyamazakura (Queen Stakes), Smile Kana (Fairy Stakes), Woman's Heart (Niigata Nisai Stakes) and Epos (Fillies' Revue). In a race run in heavy rain, Daring Tact was restrained towards the rear of the field before making rapid progress on the wide outside on the final turn. She maintained her progress as the front-runners tired, overtook Resistencia inside the last 50 metres and was finishing to such effect that she won by one and a half lengths. Resistencia held on for second ahead of Smile Kana and Cravache d'Or. After the race Matsuyama said "I concentrated on her rhythm more than where to position her today. We were far behind the leaders and desperate in catching up but she responded beautifully and stretched incredibly all the way to the line."

At Tokyo Racecourse on 24 May Daring Tact was moved up in distance and started the 0.6/1 favourite for the 2400 metre Yushun Himba. Her opponents on this occasion included Des Ailes (Sweetpea Stakes), Cravache d'Or, Miyamazakura, Sanctuaire (Shinzan Kinen), Win Marilyn (Flora Stakes), Ria Amelia (Artemis Stakes), Smile Kana, Maltese Diosa, Woman's Heart and Ablaze (Flower Cup). Daring Tact started well before being settled towards the rear of the field as Smile Kana set the pace. The stablemates Win Mighty and Win Marilyn went past the early leaders in the straight and looked to have the race between then, but Daring Tact, having briefly struggled to obtain a clear run, accelerated through a narrow gap, gained the advantage in the final strides and won by half a length. Win Marilyn beat Win Mighty a neck for second with fourth place going to Ria Amelia. Matsuyama commented "we were bumped a few times, so I decided to keep her relaxed in a lower position than planned. She instantly kicked into gear once out of traffic in the straight and showed another amazing run down the middle of the lane. Her tremendous burst of speed was extraordinary. It was the first time I rode a favorite [in Grade 1 races] and I admit I felt the pressure, so I’m relieved".

After the summer break Daring Tact returned to the track at Kyoto on 18 October and started 0.4/1 favourite for the Shuka Sho as she attempted to become the sixth filly to complete the Japanese Fillies Triple Crown and the first to do so while still undefeated. The best fancied of her seventeen opponents were Ria Ameilia, Win Mighty, Maltese Diosa, Win Marilyn, Miyamazakura and Cravache d'Or. Matsuyama settled the favourite towards the rear as Maltese Diosa set a steady pace, before making a forward move approaching the final turn and swinging to the outside as the fillies entered the straight. Daring Tact gained the advantage 200 metres from the finish and won in "comfortable" style by one and a quarter lengths and three quarters of a length from the outsiders Magic Castle and Soft Fruit. After the race Matsuyama said "The filly seemed a bit nervous at the paddock but she broke well and we were able to race in good position and in good rhythm. There was some pressure as we were aiming for the first undefeated Triple Crown filly in JRA history but I'm delighted to be able to accomplish this remarkable feat. I want to thank the filly and offer her my congratulations. She has developed into a bold filly and I hope that she will remain undefeated."

On November 29, Daring Tact was matched against older horses for the first time when she started third favourite for the 40th edition of the Japan Cup over 2400 metres at Tokyo. She settled in seventh place before staying on strongly in the straight but sustained her first defeat as she came home third behind Almond Eye and Contrail while the other beaten runners included Glory Vase, World Premiere, Kiseki and Makahiki. Matsuyama commented "I think it was a good run to finish not far behind such strong horses, and I expect her to mature."

In January 2021, Daring Tact was unanimously voted Best Three-Year-Old Filly at the JRA Awards for 2020. In the 2020 World's Best Racehorse Rankings, Daring Tact was rated on 119, making her the equal 57th best racehorse in the world.

Pedigree

Daring Tact was inbred 3 × 4 to Sunday Silence, meaning that this stallion appears in both the third and fourth generations of her pedigree.

References

2017 racehorse births
Racehorses bred in Japan
Racehorses trained in Japan
Thoroughbred family 1-l
Triple Crown of Thoroughbred Racing winners